Lawless is a surname. Notable people with the surname include:

Alex Lawless (born 1985), Welsh footballer
Blackie Lawless, stage name of Steven Duren (born 1956), American singer, songwriter and musician. Lead singer/guitarist of 1980s hard rock band W.A.S.P.
Burton Lawless (born 1953), National Football League offensive lineman
Cecil Lawless (1821–1853), Irish politician
Chris Lawless (born 1995), British cyclist
Emily Lawless (1845–1913), Irish novelist and poet
Erin Lawless (born 1985), American-Slovak basketball player
Frank Lawless (1870–1922), Irish politician and participant in the 1916 Easter Rising
Jack Lawless (born 1987), American musician
James Lawless (born 1976), Irish politician
Jayne Lawless (born 1974), English installation artist
John Lawless (disambiguation), various people
Lucy Lawless (born 1968), New Zealand actress best known for starring in the TV series Xena: Warrior Princess
Louie Lawless, Canadian actor
Margaret Wynne Lawless (1866–1939), American poet, author, educator, philanthropist
Nicholas Lawless, 1st Baron Cloncurry (1735–1799), Irish wool merchant, banker and politician
Paul Lawless (born 1964), Canadian retired National Hockey League left winger
Steven Lawless (born 1991), Scottish footballer
Terry Lawless (1933–2009), English boxing manager and trainer
Theodore K. Lawless (1892-1971), American dermatologist and philanthropist
Tom Lawless (born 1956), American Major League Baseball player
Valentine Lawless, 2nd Baron Cloncurry (1773–1853), Irish politician and landowner; son of Nicholas Lawless

Welsh-language surnames